Morawa is a Papuan language of New Guinea.

References

Languages of Papua New Guinea
Mailuan languages